Centro-Sul (South-Central) is a geographic area that encompasses the Southeastern, Southern and Central-West regions of Brazil (see Brazil Regional Division), excluding the north of Minas Gerais, most of Mato Grosso, and parts of Tocantins.

Demographics 
In this region live around 135 million Brazilians. The most remarkable characteristics of the region is the human domination over the nature: only ~5% of the native vegetation is left. Other very strong characteristic is populational and economic: most industries are concentrated in the area and responsible for ~75% of the national GDP. The vast majority of the population (+90%) is of mostly European ancestry, and more than half of the population self-identify as White Brazilian.

The region also is characterized by having a high standard of living (HDI of ~0.787, in average), where social problems are less problematic than in other regions (at least, in rural and small-medium-sized cities).

It is not difficult to find regions and small, medium and large cities whose quality of life is similar to developed countries.

Similar conditions to those of the First World are difficult to find in the geo-economic regions  Amazônia Legal and Nordeste, in Amazonia Legal the exception is the Mato Grosso in the  agribusiness belt, but the state belongs to Central-West macro-region, not to the North and Northeast, where most of the Brazilian poverty is concentrated.

The Centro Sul can often be understood as the such as the junction of South, Southeast and Central-West macro-regions, although the division does not include the north of Minas Gerais and most of Mato Grosso, besides including a very small part of the Tocantins, that in the North.

This understanding is due to the fact that the three macro-regions present similar social indicators, higher than the North and Northeast.

Despite detaining the majority of the Brazilian population there is a common sense that the Centro-Sul (except the favela minority in large cities) is the least representative of the country's reality, this is due to the high social indicators that go against the concept that the country is underdeveloped.

This misconception is even more so in relation to the South, due mainly to the temperate climate, European immigration and way of life very close to the developed countries.

Although it was always the richest geoeconomic region, the resemblance to the First World is recent, even in the South, which in the 1980s was much poorer than the neighboring countries of Uruguay and Argentina.

Only the state of São Paulo presents better indicators for a longer time, due to the strong industrialization, the development of the South and Central-West regions occurred less recently with the expansion of agribusiness.

The Centro Sul now has similar development to that of Uruguay and Argentina the richest South American countries, extreme poverty is almost eradicated in this part of Brazil while in the North and Northeast the rates are still very expressive (similar to northern countries of South America mainland and Middle/Central America - too southern/central Asian countries, Northern Africa and other regions of third world out of [[Sub-Saharan Africa]]), the similarities with the developed countries are even more evident in the South, especially Santa Catarina state, and São Paulo state.

See also
 Brazil socio-geographic division
 Amazônia Legal
 Nordeste

References 
https://exame.abril.com.br/brasil/55-das-cidades-brasileiras-tem-desenvolvimento-medio/
http://www.atlasbrasil.org.br/2013/
https://data.worldbank.org/indicator/SI.POV.DDAY

Demographics of Brazil
South Region, Brazil
Southeast Region, Brazil
Central-West Region, Brazil